Merowe Airport  is an airport serving the town of Merowe in Sudan. After critical facilities were completed in 2006, the current airport replaced the smaller Merowe Town airport  to the west.
The new Merowe airport has hosted Sudanese Air Force jet fighters, but does not host any full time units stationed.

Airlines and destinations

See also
Transport in Sudan

References

OurAirports - Sudan
Merowe

Airports in Sudan